The 2021–22 Richmond Spiders men's basketball team represented the University of Richmond during the 2021–22 NCAA Division I men's basketball season. They were led by 17th-year head coach Chris Mooney and played their home games at the Robins Center as members of the Atlantic 10 Conference. They finished the season 24–13, 10–8 in Atlantic 10 play to finish in sixth place. As the No. 6 seed, they defeated Rhode Island, VCU, Dayton, and Davidson to win the Atlantic 10 tournament. They received the conference’s automatic bid to the NCAA tournament as the No. 12 seed in the Midwest Region, where they upset Iowa in the First Round before losing to Providence in the Second Round.

On December 5, 2021, senior guard Jacob Gilyard set the new all-time NCAA Division I career steals record, securing his 386th steal to surpass Providence's John Linehan (385), whose record had stood since 2002. Gilyard ultimately finished his career with a total of 466 steals.

Previous season
In a season limited due to the ongoing COVID-19 pandemic, the Spiders finished the 2020–21 season 14–9, 6–5 in A-10 play to finish in eighth place. They lost to Duquesne in the second round of the A-10 tournament. The Spiders received an at-large bid to the National Invitation Tournament, where they defeated Toledo in the first round before losing to Mississippi State.

Offseason

Departures

Returning players 
With the NCAA granting student-athletes an extra year of eligibility due to impacts from the COVID-19 pandemic, three scholarship Spiders who would have otherwise exhausted their eligibility elected to return for the 2021–22 season: Jacob Gilyard, Nathan Cayo, and Grant Golden. Nick Sherod also elected to return despite having already spent five years in the Richmond program, including missing the entire 2020–21 season and all but six games of the 2018–19 season due to injuries.

2021 recruiting class

Roster

Schedule and results
Richmond announced its 13-game non-conference schedule on August 9, 2021, consisting of six home games, three road games, and four neutral-site games. The non-conference schedule begins on November 9 with a home game against North Carolina Central and concludes with a December 22 home game against Bucknell. The Atlantic 10 portion of Richmond's schedule was announced on September 9, 2021.

|-
!colspan=12 style=| Non-conference regular season

|-
!colspan=12 style=| A-10 regular season

|-
!colspan=9 style=| A-10 tournament

|-
!colspan=9 style=| NCAA tournament

Sources

References

Richmond
Richmond Spiders men's basketball seasons
Richmond
Richmond Spiders men's basketball
Richmond Spiders men's basketball
Richmond Spiders men's basketball